Poupartia borbonica is a species of plant in the family Anacardiaceae. It is found in Mauritius and Réunion.

References

borbonica
Critically endangered plants
Flora of Mauritius
Taxonomy articles created by Polbot